Demsino is a rural locality (a village) in Churovskoye Rural Settlement, Sheksninsky District, Vologda Oblast, Russia. The population was 87 as of 2002.

Geography 
Demsino is located 10.5 km east of Sheksna (the district's administrative centre) by road and 391 km north of Moscow, the country's capital. Slizovo is the nearest rural locality.

References 

Rural localities in Sheksninsky District